Brian Powell (born 1954) is an American sociologist James H. Rudy professor of sociology at Indiana University. He is known for his works on family, education, gender, and sexuality.
He has more than seven thousand citations on Google Scholar.

References 

American sociologists
Indiana University faculty
Living people
1954 births